Asterric acid is a fungal isolate that can inhibit endothelin binding.

Notes 

Salicylic acids
Methyl esters
Natural phenols
Salicylyl ethers
Catechol ethers
Salicylate esters